This is a list of Hungarian Twenty20 International cricketers.

In April 2018, the ICC decided to grant full Twenty20 International (T20I) status to all its members. Therefore, all Twenty20 matches played between Hungary and other ICC members after 1 January 2019 will have T20I status.

This list comprises all members of the Hungary cricket team who have played at least one T20I match. It is initially arranged in the order in which each player won his first Twenty20 cap. Where more than one player will win his first Twenty20 cap in the same match, those players are listed alphabetically by surname (according to the name format used by Cricinfo).

Hungary played their first match with T20I status on 2 September 2021, against the Czech Republic during the 2021 Continental Cup.

Key

List of players
Statistics are correct as of 3 July 2022.

References 

Hungary
cricket, Twenty20 International